Mark Twain National Forest  (MTNF) is a U.S. National Forest located in the southern half of Missouri. MTNF was established on September 11, 1939. It is named for author Mark Twain, a Missouri native. MTNF spans 29 counties and represents 11% of all forested land in Missouri. MTNF is divided into six distinct ranger districts: Ava-Cassville-Willow Springs, Eleven Point, Houston-Rolla, Cedar Creek, Poplar Bluff, Potosi-Fredericktown, and the Salem. The six ranger districts actually comprise nine overall unique tracts of forests. Its headquarters are in Rolla, Missouri.

The 350-mile Ozark Trail system winds through much of the National Forest.

The Forest has two trail systems for certain motorized vehicles and bikes, being the Chadwick Motorcycle & ATV Use Area and the Sutton Bluff ATV, UTV, and Motorcycle Trail System.

History
The Mark Twain National Forest, as we know it today, was created on February 17, 1976. The Mark Twain National forest has a rather unusual history – for it was once known as both the Clark National Forest and the Mark Twain National Forest – both being proclaimed on September 11, 1939.

In June 1973, the Clark and Mark Twain NF were brought under one headquarters in Rolla and became known as the National forests in Missouri. On February 17, 1976, the forests were combined and renamed the Mark Twain National Forest.

Missouri’s only national forest, The Mark Twain, encompasses roughly 1.5 million acres, mostly within the Ozark Highlands. Located across southern Missouri and northern Arkansas, the Ozark Highlands are an ancient landscape characterized by large permanent springs, over 5,000 caves, rocky barren glades, old volcanic mountains and nationally recognized streams. Portions of the Ozarks were never under oceans, nor were the areas glaciated.

In the 1870s, citizens of southern Missouri began an era of extensive logging of the state's native oak, hickory, and pine forests. Lumber mills were commonplace, but by the 1920s they had disappeared, along with much of the state's native forests. Thus, in 1939, President Franklin D. Roosevelt signed the MTNF into existence. In March 1933, he also created the Emergency Conservation Work Act, better known as the Civilian Conservation Corps (CCC). In the area that would later become the Mark Twain National Forest, hundreds of young men at over 50 CCC sites worked at building roads and planting hundreds of acres of pine to preserve and enhance the natural resources of southern Missouri. Many of their contributions can still be visited and enjoyed today including the Rolla Ranger Station Historic District and Winona Ranger Station Historic District.

Wilderness areas 

Bell Mountain Wilderness
Devils Backbone Wilderness
Hercules-Glades Wilderness
Irish Wilderness
Paddy Creek Wilderness
Piney Creek Wilderness
Rockpile Mountain Wilderness

Counties

Although it is far from being the largest National Forest in acreage, Mark Twain National Forest is located in more counties than any other. , its  were spread over parts of 29 counties in southern and central Missouri.

Climate

References

Sources

External links 

 

 
National Forests of Missouri
Ozarks
Civilian Conservation Corps in Missouri
National Forests of the U.S. Interior Highlands
Protected areas of Oregon County, Missouri
Protected areas of Ripley County, Missouri
Protected areas of Iron County, Missouri
Protected areas of Carter County, Missouri
Protected areas of Reynolds County, Missouri
Protected areas of Wayne County, Missouri
Protected areas of Shannon County, Missouri
Protected areas of Washington County, Missouri
Protected areas of Dent County, Missouri
Protected areas of Taney County, Missouri
Protected areas of Phelps County, Missouri
Protected areas of Barry County, Missouri
Protected areas of Christian County, Missouri
Protected areas of Madison County, Missouri
Protected areas of Howell County, Missouri
Protected areas of Crawford County, Missouri
Protected areas of Texas County, Missouri
Protected areas of Butler County, Missouri
Protected areas of Douglas County, Missouri
Protected areas of Pulaski County, Missouri
Protected areas of Ozark County, Missouri
Protected areas of Laclede County, Missouri
Protected areas of Callaway County, Missouri
Protected areas of Stone County, Missouri
Protected areas of Ste. Genevieve County, Missouri
Protected areas of Wright County, Missouri
Protected areas of Boone County, Missouri
Protected areas of Bollinger County, Missouri
Protected areas of St. Francois County, Missouri
Protected areas established in 1939
1939 establishments in Missouri